The Nigeria men's national field hockey team represents Nigeria in international men's field hockey competitions. The team were awarded bronze at the 1987 All-Africa Games.

Tournament history

Africa Cup of Nations
 1974 – 4th place
 1983 – 4th place
 2000 – 5th place
 2005 – 4th place
 2009 – 4th place
 2017 – 5th place
 2022 –

African Games
 1987 – 
 1991 – 5th place
 1995 – 6th place
 2003 – 4th place

African Olympic Qualifier
 2007 – 5th place
 2015 – 5th place
 2019 – Withdrew

Hockey World League
2012–13 – Round 1
2016–17 – Round 1

See also
Nigeria women's national field hockey team

References

External links
FIH profile

African men's national field hockey teams
field hockey
Men's sport in Nigeria
National team